Nuri is a place in modern Sudan on the west side of the Nile, near the Fourth Cataract. Nuri is situated about 15 km north of Sanam, and 10 km from Jebel Barkal.

Nuri is the second of three Napatan burial sites and the construction of pyramids at Nuri began when there was no longer enough space at El-Kurru. More than 20 ancient pyramids belonging to Nubian kings and queens are still standing at Nuri, which served as a royal necropolis for the ancient city of Napata, the first capital of the Nubian Kingdom of Kush. It is probable that, at its apex, 80 or more pyramids stood at Nuri, marking the tombs of royals. The pyramids at Nuri were built over a period of more than three centuries, from circa 670 BCE for the oldest (pyramid of Taharqa), to around 310 BCE (pyramid of king Nastasen).  

The earliest known pyramid (Nu. 1) at Nuri belongs to king Taharqa which measures 51.75 meters square by 40 or by 50 metres high. The pyramid of Taharqa was situated so that when observed from Jebel Barkal at sunrise on Egyptian New Year's Day, the beginning of the annual flooding of the Nile, the sun would rise from the horizon directly over its point.

Tantamani, successor of Taharqa, was buried at el-Kurru, but all following Napatan kings and many of their queens and children until Nastasen (Nu. 15) (about 315 BC) were buried here, some 80 royals. The pyramids at Nuri are, in general, smaller than the Egyptian ones and are today often heavily degraded (caused by both humans and nature), but often still contained substantial parts of the funerary equipment of the Kushite rulers who were buried here. During the Christian era, a church was erected here. The church was built at least in part from reused pyramid stones, including several stelae originally coming from the pyramid chapels.

The pyramids were partially excavated by George Reisner in the early 20th century. In 2018, a new archaeological expedition began work at the site, directed by Pearce Paul Creasman.

The pyramids of Nuri, together with other buildings in the region around Gebel Barkal, have been placed on the UNESCO list of world cultural heritage sites since 2003.

Tombs at Nuri
 See List of monarchs of Kush for more information.

The royal family of Kush was buried in the cemeteries of Nuri and el-Kurru.
The King's Mothers were buried in the southern group, but this is not an area exclusively used for the burial of King's Mothers. Most of the King's Wives were buried in the parallel rows just north of Taharqa's tomb. The tombs to the far north were much smaller and may have been built for wives of lesser rank. It was also found by Dows Dunham, an experienced archaeologist, that there were references to two other kings in three of the pyramids including King Taharqa. But, if they are buried there, their tombs have yet to be located and excavated.
  Nuri 1 - King Taharqa, the earliest and largest of the Nuri pyramids
  Nuri 2 - King Amaniastabarqa
  Nuri 3 - King Senkamanisken
  Nuri 4 - King Siaspiqa
  Nuri 5 - King Malonaqen
   Nuri 6 - King Anlamani, son of King Senkamanisken
  Nuri 7 - King Karkamani
  Nuri 8 - King Aspelta, son of King Senkamanisken and Queen Naparaye
  Nuri 9 - King Aramatle-qo, son of Aspelta
 Nuri 10 - King Amaninatakilebte
  Nuri 11 - King Malewiebamani
  Nuri 12 - King Amanineteyerike, son of King Malewiebamani
  Nuri 13 - King Harsiotef
  Nuri 14 - King Akhraten
  Nuri 15 - King Nastasen
  Nuri 16 - King Talakhamani
  Nuri 17 - King Baskakeren, son of King Malewiebamani
  Nuri 18 - King Analmaye
  Nuri 19 - King Nasakhma
  Nuri 20 - King Atlanersa, Son of Taharqa
 Nuri 21 - Possibly Takahatenamun, Queen. Wife of Taharqa
  Nuri 22 - Possibly Amanimalel, Queen. Wife of King Senkamanisken
 Nuri 23 - Masalaye, Queen? Probably wife of King Senkamanisken
 Nuri 24 - Nasalsa, Queen. Daughter of Atlanersa, wife of King Senkamanisken
 Nuri 25 - Maletaral II, Queen?. Time of King Amaninatakilebte
 Nuri 26 - Amanitakaye, Queen. Daughter of Aspelta, sister-wife of Aramatle-qo, mother of Malonaqen
 Nuri 27 - Madiqen, Queen. Wife of Anlamani
 Nuri 28 - Henuttakhebit, Queen. Wife of Aspelta
 Nuri 29 - Pi'ankhqew-qa Queen? Possibly wife of King Siaspiqa
 Nuri 31 - Saka'aye, Queen. Probably mother of King Malewiebamani
 Nuri 32 - Akhrasan, Queen. Temp. King Malewiebamani
 Nuri 34 - Henutirdis, Queen. From the time of King Harsiotef
 Nuri 35 - Possibly Queen Abar, wife of Piye, Mother of Taharqa
 Nuri 36 - Atakhebasken Queen. Wife of Taharqa
 Nuri 38 - Akheqa, Queen. Daughter of Aspelta and wife of Aramatle-qo
 Nuri 39 - Maletasen, Queen. Wife of Aramatle-qo
 Nuri 40 - Meqemale, Queen. Possibly wife of Aspelta
 Nuri 41 - Maletaral(?) I, Queen. Wife of Atlanersa
 Nuri 42 - Asata, Queen. Wife of Aspelta
 Nuri 44 - Batahaliye, Queen. Wife of Harsiotef
 Nuri 45 - Tagtal (?), Queen. Wife of King Malonaqen
 Nuri 53 - Yeturow, Queen. Sister-Wife of Atlanersa
 Nuri 55 - Atmataka, Queen. Wife of Aramatle-qo
 Nuri 56 - Possibly Sekhmakh, Queen. Wife of Nastasen
 Nuri 57 - Piankhher( ?), Queen. Possible wife of Aramatle-qo
 Nuri 58 - Artaha, Queen. Possible wife of Aspelta
 Nuri 59 - Malaqaye, Queen. Possibly a wife of King Tantamani
 Nuri 61 - Atasamale, Queen. Possibly a wife of Amanineteyerike

Tomb artifacts

Numerous artifacts were found in the Nuri tombs, mainly excavated in 1916 by the Harvard University–Boston Museum of Fine Arts Expedition. It is noted that looting was present in all of the pyramids as they were accessible by digging a hole through the ground. Based on objects found within and around the tombs, it is likely that these looters came hundreds of years later. Of what remained, several fragments and completed Napatan red ware pottery were found within several tombs.

See also
 Nubian pyramids
 Pyramids at El-Kurru
 Pyramids of Jebel Barkal
 Pyramids of Meroë
 Sedeinga pyramids

References

Literature 
 Dows Dunham. The Royal Cemeteries of Kush II, Nuri, Boston (Mass.): Museum of Fine Arts, 1955.

External links
 Pyramids of Nuri (flickr)
 Nuri Pyramids
 

History of Sudan
World Heritage Sites in Sudan
Archaeological sites in Sudan
Kingdom of Kush
Twenty-fifth Dynasty of Egypt
Pyramids in Sudan
Populated places in Northern (state)